"Love Love Love" is the second single written by rock singer Lenny Kravitz and Craig Ross for Kravitz's eighth studio album, It Is Time for a Love Revolution (2008). The domestic version of the video premiered on MTV's TRL on June 3, 2008.

Chart performance

References

2008 singles
Lenny Kravitz songs
Song recordings produced by Lenny Kravitz
Songs written by Lenny Kravitz
Songs written by Craig Ross
Music videos directed by Philip Andelman
2007 songs
Virgin Records singles